Chow Kwong Choi (born 3 December 1943) is a former Hong Kong cyclist. He competed in three events at the 1964 Summer Olympics. He is the twin brother of Chow Kwong Man.

References

External links
 

1943 births
Living people
Hong Kong male cyclists
Olympic cyclists of Hong Kong
Cyclists at the 1964 Summer Olympics
Twin sportspeople
Hong Kong twins
Place of birth missing (living people)